Neuffer is a surname. Notable people with the surname include:

Elizabeth Neuffer (1956–2003), American journalist
Georg Neuffer (1895–1977), German Luftwaffe general
Judith Neuffer (born 1948), United States Naval Aviator and NASA administrator
Taufa Neuffer (born 1978), Tahitian footballer